Tracy Ifeachor  is a British television and theatre actress best known for playing the role of Aya Al-Rashid in The CW vampire series The Originals and Abigail Naismith in both parts of the Doctor Who Christmas special, "The End of Time".

Early life and education
Ifeachor was  born in Plymouth, Devon, England, where she attended Plymouth College preparatory school followed by the secondary school Eggbuckland College, also in Plymouth. Ifeachor attended The Raleigh School of Speech and Drama under the tutorship of Norma Blake and the Deborah Bond Dance academy, where she enjoyed the ISTD syllabus in tap, ballet, modern and jazz. After completing her A-levels, Ifeachor used her gap year to audition for London drama schools and gained a scholarship to the Webber Douglas Academy of Dramatic Art in London.

Career
After graduating from the now merged Central School of Speech and Drama,  Ifeachor appeared in her first feature film, Blooded, directed by Sundance Film Festival winner Ed Boase and appeared in two commercials. Ifeachor then went on to make her theatre debut as Minerva in the Royal Shakespeare Companys production of Noughts & Crosses, directed and adapted by Dominic Cooke. It was from here she made her television debut as Leila in the "No Going Back" episode of BBC One’s Casualty.

Ifeachor went on to play Rosalind in Tim Supple’s As You Like It for the opening of the new Curve Theatre in Leicester. Whilst rehearsing, Ifeachor was offered the role of Abigail Naismith in David Tennant’s final two Doctor Who episodes ("The End Of Time" Parts One and Two) which were broadcast at Christmas 2009 and on New Year's Day 2010. She played the daughter of the billionaire Joshua Naismith (David Harewood) who wanted his daughter to have immortality and live forever.

Ifeachor played the role of Beneatha in Lorraine Hansberry’s A Raisin In The Sun, directed by Michael Buffong for the Royal Exchange Theatre in Manchester which opened to rave reviews. She also played Ismene at The National Theatre in the premiere of Moira Buffini's play Welcome to Thebes, directed by Richard Eyre from 15 June to September 2010.

Ifeachor's radio work includes the role of Queenie in the 2011 BBC Radio 4 Classic Serial production of Edna Ferber's Show Boat.

In 2016, Ifeachor was cast in the ABC thriller series Quantico in the recurring role of Lydia Hall.

Filmography

References

External links

 Ifeachor Tracy: Artist Profile

Living people
1985 births
Actresses from Plymouth, Devon
Black British actresses
English film actresses
English television actresses
People educated at Plymouth College
Alumni of the Webber Douglas Academy of Dramatic Art
English people of Igbo descent
Igbo actresses